The National Softball League or NSL is a co-ed slowpitch softball league created for the 2009 British softball season (April–September). The league has run every season since then and grew to a two-division league in 2017. The inaugural season had 14 teams compete in three qualifying events, as well as the Premier Nationals (the top sports championship in the UK).

Twelve teams compete in NSL1 and twelve teams compete in NSL 2 with promotion and relegation taking place between the divisions. For 2019, the Manchester Thunder were relegated from NSL1 to NSL2 while the Manchester Mavericks were promoted from NSL2 to NSL1.

The 2018 season will see the addition of an NSL3 tournament in which eight teams will compete in a 2-day tournament. The top two finishing teams will replace the two relegated teams from NSL2 (Pyromaniacs & Outlaws) for the 2019 season.

The concept of the NSL is to improve the top level of co-ed slowpitch softball in the UK by exposing more players and teams to top-level competition.

The league's founders, Roger Grooms and Matthew Slorach, came up with the idea to link the already existing tournaments into a series, where points were awarded based on the finishing positions of teams at each event. This concept has been expanded upon where the NSL now provides a pre-defined fixture list for the season which makes sure each team plays all of the others in its division in a home and away format.

The 2020 National Softball League season was cancelled due to COVID-19. In 2021, the NSL season is set to resume with a slightly modified schedule - again, due to COVID-19. NSL1 & NSL2 teams will each play a shortened 11-game season. As a result, no teams will be promoted or relegated.

Results 
The winners and runners-up from each season of NSL play:

Current format 
The two divisions for the 2021 season contain the following teams:

Inaugural 2009 season standings 
The original 2009 teams and standings were:

The benefits of the NSL were seen during the 2009 season with fourteen teams competing at the 2009 Premier Nationals (up from seven teams at the 2008 A Nationals, which they replaced), increased interest from sponsors in the sport, and television coverage of the final at the Bristol tournament.

References

External links 
 

Softball competitions in the United Kingdom
Sports leagues established in 2009
2009 establishments in the United Kingdom
Professional sports leagues in the United Kingdom